Antoine Chappey (born 1960) is a French actor. He has appeared in over 80 films and television shows since 1989. He starred in the film Nelly, which was screened in the Un Certain Regard section at the 2004 Cannes Film Festival.

Selected filmography
 The Letter (1999)
 To Matthieu (2000)
 The Milk of Human Kindness (2001)
 I'm Going Home (2001)
 Nelly (2004)
 The Hook (2004)
 The Young Lieutenant (2005)
 La Maison du Bonheur (2006)
 Mark of an Angel (2008)
 Iris in Bloom (2011)
 The Great Game (2015)
 Fool Moon (2016)
 C'est la vie ! (2017)

References

External links

1960 births
Living people
French male film actors
French male television actors
20th-century French male actors
21st-century French male actors